Samuel Honrubia (born 5 July 1986) is a former French handball player, who competed for and the French national team. He has competed at the 2012 Summer Olympics, where France won the gold medal.

References

1986 births
Living people
French male handball players
Handball players at the 2012 Summer Olympics
Olympic handball players of France
Olympic gold medalists for France
Olympic medalists in handball
Medalists at the 2012 Summer Olympics
Sportspeople from Béziers
European champions for France
21st-century French people